Falcaria vulgaris, the sickleweed or longleaf, is the sole species in the genus Falcaria. It is a biennial herb of the spherical shape. Blossoms in June–July. Grows in Europe, Siberia, Middle East, Northern Africa, North and South Americas. Contains alkaloids, carotene, vitamin C, proteins.

Its use as an alternative medicine may offer several advantages, especially in the treatment of stomach and skin ulcers, diabetes, infections, and liver and kidney disorders.

References

External links

Apioideae